The 1992–93 FC Bayern Munich season was the 93rd season in the club's history and 28th season since promotion from Regionalliga Süd in 1965.  Bayern finished its Bundesliga campaign in second place behind SV Werder Bremen by one point.  The club held first place until matchday 33 when the club fell to second.  In the DFB-Pokal, Bayern made it to the second round when the club was eliminated by Borussia Dortmund.  The team was managed by Erich Ribbeck.  Due to the previous season finish of tenth place in the Bundesliga, the club did not compete in any UEFA sanctioned competitions.

Results

Friendlies

Trofeo Dino Viola

Bundesliga

League results

League standings

DFB Pokal

Team statistics

Players

Squad, appearances and goals

|-
|colspan="14"|Players sold or loaned out after the start of the season:

|}

Bookings

Transfers

In

Out

References

FC Bayern Munich seasons
Bayern